Hallsberg Municipality (Hallsbergs kommun) is a municipality in Örebro County in central Sweden. Its seat is located in the town of Hallsberg.

The present municipality was created in 1971 when the market town (köping) of Hallsberg was amalgamated with adjacent municipalities. A series of amalgamations had taken place in the area in 1952, 1963 and 1967.

Localities
Hallsberg (seat)
Hjortkvarn
Pålsboda
Sköllersta
Vretstorp
Östansjö

Elections
These are the results of the elections in the municipality since the first election after the municipal reform, being held in 1973. The exact results of Sweden Democrats were not listed at a municipal level by SCB from 1988 to 1998 due to the party's small size at the time. "Turnout" denotes the percentage of eligible people casting any ballots, whereas "Votes" denotes the number of valid votes only.

Riksdag

Blocs

This lists the relative strength of the socialist and centre-right blocs since 1973, but parties not elected to the Riksdag are inserted as "other", including the Sweden Democrats results from 1988 to 2006, but also the Christian Democrats pre-1991 and the Greens in 1982, 1985 and 1991. The sources are identical to the table above. The coalition or government mandate marked in bold formed the government after the election. New Democracy got elected in 1991 but are still listed as "other" due to the short lifespan of the party.

Twin towns
Hallsberg's three twin towns with the year of its establishing:

 Toijala, Finland (since 1946)
 Valga, Estonia (since 1991)
 Gifhorn, Germany (since 1996)

References

External links

Hallsberg Municipality - Official site

Municipalities of Örebro County
1971 establishments in Sweden